The Bushrangers; or Norwood Vale was the first play with an Australian theme to be published and staged in Australia.

It marked the earliest appearance of blackface in an Australian play.

References

External links
The Bushrangers at AustLit

Australian plays
1834 plays